Oleksandr Oleksandrovych Filippov (born 23 October 1992) is a Ukrainian professional footballer who plays as a striker for Sint-Truiden.

Club career

Desna Chernihiv 
In 2016, Filippov moved to Desna Chernihiv With the club he was promoted to the Ukrainian Premier League in the 2017–18 season. In the 2018–19 Ukrainian Premier League season, he played 28 matches and scored 5 goals. On 30 October 2019 he scored 2 goals in Ukrainian Cup against MFC Mykolaiv away at the Tsentralnyi Miskyi Stadion.

He was the second top scorer in the 2019–20 Ukrainian Premier League with 16 goals and helped his club qualify for the 2020–21 Europa League third qualifying round for the first time in club history. Filippov was also included in the Ukrainian Premier League Best IX for the season.

Sint-Truiden 
On 22 September 2020 he signed a three-year contract with Sint-Truiden for €1.5 million, becoming the most expensive player sold by Desna Chernihiv. He made his debut for the club in the Belgian First Division A against Mechelen at the AFAS-stadion Achter de Kazerne, replacing Facundo Colidio in the 66th minute. On 17 October he scored his first league goal against Beerschot at the Olympisch Stadion. On 3 February 2021, he made his debut in the 2020–21 Belgian Cup against Lokeren-Temse at the Daknamstadion.

Loan to Riga 
In February 2022 he moved on loan to Riga in the Latvian Higher League. On 12 March he scored his first league goal by converting a penalty kick against Valmiera. On 7 July he scored against Derry City at the Ryan McBride Brandywell Stadium in the 2022–23 UEFA Europa Conference League first qualifying round.

Outside of professional football
In March 2022, during the Siege of Chernihiv, Filippov, together with other former Desna Chernihiv players, helped raise money for the civilian population of the city of Chernihiv. In April, he donated his Sint-Truiden kit to a fundraiser, all proceeds from which will go to the aid of the Ukrainian Armed Forces.

International career
In January 2013, he reached the final of the 2013 Commonwealth of Independent States Cup with the Ukraine under-21 team, playing in four matches and scoring one goal.

Career statistics

Club

Honours
Desna Chernihiv
 Ukrainian First League: 2017–18

Riga FC
 Latvian Higher League: Runner-up 2022

Ukraine national under-21
Commonwealth of Independent States Cup: Runner-up 2013

Individual
 Desna Chernihiv Player of the Year: (2) 2017, 2020

References

External links
 From Official the website of the Ukrainian Premier League
 
 
 

1992 births
Living people
People from Avdiivka
Association football forwards
Ukrainian footballers
Ukrainian expatriate footballers
Serhiy Bubka College of Olympic Reserve alumni
FC Arsenal Kyiv players
FC Mariupol players
FC Makiyivvuhillya Makiyivka players
FC Kramatorsk players
FC Desna Chernihiv players
Sint-Truidense V.V. players
Riga FC players
Ukrainian Premier League players
Ukrainian First League players
Ukrainian Second League players
Ukraine youth international footballers
Ukraine under-21 international footballers
Belgian Pro League players
Latvian Higher League players
Expatriate footballers in Belgium
Expatriate footballers in Latvia
Ukrainian expatriate sportspeople in Belgium
Ukrainian expatriate sportspeople in Latvia
Sportspeople from Donetsk Oblast